Soul of the Beast is a 1923 American silent romantic drama film directed by John Griffith Wray and starring Madge Bellamy, Cullen Landis, and Noah Beery.

Cast

References

Bibliography
 Munden, Kenneth White. The American Film Institute Catalog of Motion Pictures Produced in the United States, Part 1. University of California Press, 1997.

External links

Soul of the Beast (1923): A Silent Film Review at moviessilently.com
Soul of the Beast (1923) reviews at silentsaregolden.com

1923 films
1923 drama films
Silent American drama films
Films directed by John Griffith Wray
American silent feature films
1920s English-language films
American black-and-white films
Metro Pictures films
1920s American films